The Registry of Standard Biological Parts is a collection of genetic parts that are used in the assembly of systems and devices in synthetic biology. The registry was founded in 2003 at the Massachusetts Institute of Technology. The registry, as of 2018, contains over 20,000 parts. Recipients of the genetic parts include academic labs, established scientists, and student teams participating in the iGEM Foundation's annual synthetic biology competition.

The Registry of Standard Biological Parts conforms to the BioBrick standard, a standard for interchangeable genetic parts. BioBrick was developed by a nonprofit composed of researchers from MIT, Harvard, and UCSF. The registry offers genetic parts with the expectation that recipients will contribute data and new parts to improve the resource. The registry records and indexes biological parts and offers services including the synthesis and assembly of biological parts, systems, and devices.

The registry offers many types of biological parts, including DNA, plasmids, plasmid backbones, primers, promoters, protein coding sequences, protein domains, ribosomal binding sites, terminators, translational units, riboregulators, and composite parts. It also includes devices such as protein generators, reporters, inverters, receptors, senders, and measurement devices. A key idea that motivated the development of the Registry was to develop an abstraction hierarchy implemented through the parts categorization system.  

The registry has previously received external funding through grants from the National Science Foundation, the Defense Advanced Research Projects Agency, and the National Institutes of Health.

See also
Synthetic biology

References

External links
 Registry of Standard Biological Parts

2003 introductions
Biology websites
Biotechnology
Massachusetts Institute of Technology
Synthetic biology